Mauritian Solidarity Front (in French Front Solidarité Mauricien), also known by its acronym FSM is a  political party in Mauritius trying to represent the island nation's sizable Muslim minority. Until 2004, the party was known as Hizbullah (Party of God)  (no relation to the Lebanese party Hezbollah). The theocratic party is centered around its leader Cehl M. Fakeemeeah. In 1992, Cehl Fakeemeeah announced the formation of the Hizbullah later renamed Mauritian Solidarity Front. FSM is also considered to be the real successor of Comite Action Musulman (C.A.M.) led by Sir Abdul Razakh Mohammed in the past. In fact, since the Elections of 2000 , there was no Muslim party in Mauritius except FSM. The history of Mauritius recognise FSM as the second largest Muslim party in the history of Mauritius.

Beginnings
Cehl Fakeemeeah known as Cehl Meeah, was born in Mauritius in 1958. He began to teach the Qur'an to groups of children in the local mosque when he was 15. At 21, he won a scholarship to Umm Al-Qura University in Makkah where he studied Islamic jurisprudence and returned to Mauritius in 1991.

When he decided to enter the political arena, and his members suggested the name Hizbullah, which could best describe his convictions.  He indulged in some social activities, such as helping the poor and the needy of Plaine-Verte, Vallée Pitot and others. He also initiated free drug-detoxification programs in response to an increase in trafficking of street drugs in the Muslim areas. He has been accused on several occasions by the media to prey on the poverty of people to ramp up his popularity.

History
With the Comité Action Musulman winning 5 seats in the 1967 general elections, Cehl Meeah collaborated with PTr and Parti Mauricien Social Démocrate (PMSD) to win against the Mauritian Militant Movement (MMM) after the 1976 general elections. In the 1982 general elections, he continued collaboration with PTr under the banner of National Alliance Party.

Although The Mauritian Islamic Party won 9,334 votes during the 1982 elections and Muslim People Front won 8,233 votes during the 1995 general elections, after the year 2000, there was only Hizbullah to represent Muslims in elections. Other small Muslim parties were formed with minimal votes but afterwards were dissolved. These included the Mauritius Muslim Democratic League and the National Mauritian Muslim Rights initially Mauritian Muslim Rights in elections held in 1976 and 1983.

Cehl Meeah ran for the elections in 1992 but failed to be elected. But he ran for the municipal elections in 1995 and was elected municipal counselor. In 1995 having formed Hizbullah, his party won its first seat in the parliament through Imaam Beehary due to "best loser system". Beehary was a preacher at the Noor-e-Islam mosque in Port Louis.  Hizbullah failed subsequently to win any seats in the 2000 and 2005 general elections although having gathered a great number of voters throughout the island.

In the 2010 general elections in Mauritius, FSM won 51,161 votes throughout the island and one seat through its leader, Cehl Meeah winning one historical parliamentary seat.

In the 2014 general elections, he won 41,815 votes.

Meah was defeated in the 2014 general election and in the 2015 municipal elections.

Controversies
Cehl Meeah (Cehl Fakeemeeah) is also known to have alleged links with a radical militia known as "l'Escadron de la Mort" which used to burn down what they considered not allowed by the Islamic faith in the capital. The militia was responsible for burning down a betting house in the capital, killing 4 people who lived upstairs. In December 2000, Hizbullah leader Cehl Fakeemeeah was arrested and accused of involvement in the murders of three Mauritian Militant Movement (MMM) members just before the island's 1996 parliamentary elections. The UK based Islamic Human Rights Commission (IHRC) adopted his case declaring him a "Prisoner of Faith" and considering his arrest a direct result of his political opposition. It also expressed concerns about his treatment in detention.

His political views are commonly considered radical, extremist and theocratic. The FSM's wish to shape politics and governing policy from religious views. He is known for his strong views on abortion which he claims as being an abomination against God. He strongly opposes gay rights on the island and is a strong supporter of proselytism.

On Monday, 5 March 2012, Cehl Meeah was cleared of all charges leveled against him regarding the hold-up at the Bijoulux jewellery shop following which he was again freed of any accusations in the case of the room 216 at Victoria Hotel on Wednesday, 7 March 2012.

References

External links
 Official website

Political parties in Mauritius
Political parties established in 1990
1990 establishments in Mauritius
Conservative parties in Africa
Right-wing parties